RUNT Linux is an acronym for ResNet USB Network Tester. It is one of many Linux distributions designed to run from a USB flash drive. RUNT is based on Slackware's bare kernel. It was originally designed as a network tool for students at North Carolina State University. It consists of a boot floppy image and a zip file, similar to zipslack. It is intended to be a fairly complete Linux installation for use as a testing tool capable of booting on any x86 computer with a USB port and a bootable floppy.

External links
Runt Linux Homepage of the distribution
Linux on a Stick! Screenshot walkthrough showing how to put Runt on a pendrive
 RUNT Linux at DistroWatch

Live USB
Linux distributions